Limnaea or Limnaia or Limnaeum or Limnaion (Λιμναίον) was a town of Histiaeotis in ancient Thessaly, taken by the Romans in 191 BCE.

Its location is within the bounds of the modern town of Vlochos.

References

Populated places in ancient Thessaly
Former populated places in Greece
Histiaeotis